Ilmar Kullam (15 June 1922, Tartu – 2 November 2011, Tartu) was an Estonian basketball player who competed for the Soviet Union in the 1952 Summer Olympics. He was a member of the Soviet team, which won the silver medal. He played all eight matches. He trained at VSS Kalev in Tartu. He is 191 cm power forward. He was elected to the Hall of Fame of Estonian basketball in 2010.

Club career 
Started playing basketball in 1938 as a member of Kalev Tartu. With the team of the Kalev Tallinn he won a bronze medal (1945), with the team of the University of Tartu he won a gold medal (1949), a silver medal (1950) and bronze medal (1951) of Soviet Union League Championship.

Coach career 
After his career as a player, worked as a basketball coach in Tartu, coached the Estonian National Team and Kalev Tartu in the Championships of the Soviet Union (1960–75, as the head coach until 1971). Assistant coach of the women’s team of the University of Tartu in 1978–87 and the Estonian Women’s National Team in 1978–85.

Achievements

National Team 
 Olympic Games:  1952
 European Championships:  1947,  1951,  1953

Club 
 Soviet Union League Championship: 1949
 Estonian SSR Championship: 1948, 1956, 1957, 1960

Orders

 Order of the White Star, 5th Class: 1997

References

Further reading 

 
 Tiit Lääne, Eesti olümpiamedalivõitjad 1912–2006. Tallinn 2006 (ISBN 9949-427-25-8)
 Vello Lään. "Pikk blond mees palliga" Tartu, 2008 (ISBN 9789949435173)

External links
Profile at Olympics.com (archieved version)

1922 births
2011 deaths
Sportspeople from Tartu
Academic staff of the University of Tartu
Basketball players at the 1952 Summer Olympics
FIBA EuroBasket-winning players
Medalists at the 1952 Summer Olympics
Olympic basketball players of the Soviet Union
Olympic medalists in basketball
Olympic silver medalists for the Soviet Union
BC Kalev/Cramo players
Korvpalli Meistriliiga players
Tartu Ülikool/Rock players
Honoured Masters of Sport of the USSR
Merited Coaches of the Soviet Union
Recipients of the Order of the Red Banner of Labour
Recipients of the Order of the White Star, 5th Class
Estonian basketball coaches
Estonian men's basketball players
Soviet basketball coaches
Soviet men's basketball players